Milligan Shuford Wise and Theron Colbert Dellinger Houses is a set of two historic homes located at Crossnore, Avery County, North Carolina, United States. They were built in 1926 and 1927, and are rustic -story, frame American Craftsman-style houses. The Wise House is surrounded by contributing landscaping. Also on the property are a contributing garage apartment (c. 1932–1935) and stone one-story Wise Cottage (c. 1941).

It was listed on the National Register of Historic Places in 2008.

References

Houses on the National Register of Historic Places in North Carolina
Houses completed in 1927
Houses in Avery County, North Carolina
National Register of Historic Places in Avery County, North Carolina